The 2006 Tour Féminin en Limousin was the second edition of the Tour Féminin en Limousin, a women's cycling stage race in France. It was rated by the UCI as category 2.2 race, and was held between 21 and 23 July 2006.

Stages

Stage 1
21 July 2006 – Limoges to Landouge, Individual time trial

Stage 2
22 July 2006 – Auphelle to Auphelle,

Stage 3
23 July 2006 – Dun Le Palestel to Naillat,

Final classifications

General classification

Source

Points classification

Source

Mountains classification

Source

Most combative classification

Source

Youth classification

Source

See also
 2006 in women's road cycling

References

External links

2006 in women's road cycling
Tour Féminin en Limousin
Tour Féminin en Limousin
Tour Féminin en Limousin